Badhra Sub-division is one of the sub-district and a potential future district in Bhiwani district of Haryana state in northern India.

Overview
Badhra is one of the 6 Vidhan Sabha constituencies located in Bhiwani district.

Members of Legislative Assembly
Badhra is the seat of Badhra (Haryana Assembly constituency). 
2014: Sukhvinder Singh, Bhartiya Janta Party

See also
 Bhiwani

References

Bhiwani district